Benjamin Britten (1913–1976) was an English composer, conductor and pianist.

Britten or Benjamin Britten may also refer to:
Britten (surname)
4079 Britten, an outer main-belt asteroid
Britten Inlet, an ice-filled inlet on Monteverdi Peninsula, Antarctica
Britten_(Losheim_am_See), a village in the Losheim am See municipality
Britten Motorcycle Company, a New Zealand motorcycle company founded by John Britten
Benjamin Britten (train)
The Benjamin Britten High School, a high school in Lowestoft, Suffolk, UK

See also
Britain (disambiguation)
Briton (disambiguation)
Brittain (disambiguation)
Brittan, a surname
Britten-Norman, a British aircraft manufacturer
Britton (surname)
Brython, a pre-Roman inhabitant of Great Britain